Jim Brownell (born 29 January 1948) is a former politician in Ontario, Canada. He was a Liberal member of the Legislative Assembly of Ontario from 2003 to 2011. One of his distant ancestors, John Brownell, represented the same general region in the Upper Canadian parliament from 1808 to 1809.

Background
Brownell has a Bachelor of Arts degree, a Bachelor of Education degree, and a Master of Education degree from the University of Ottawa.  He was a teacher with the Upper Canada District School Board for thirty-two years. In 1992 completed the principal's qualification program at Queen's University. He has been involved with many local organizations, including the Lost Villages Historical Society and Museum. In 2002, he was awarded a Queen Elizabeth Golden Jubilee Medal by his community.

Politics
Brownell served for fourteen years as a councillor, deputy reeve and reeve in Cornwall Township and South Stormont Township.

Incumbent Stormont-Dundas-Charlottenburgh Liberal MPP John Cleary retired before the 2003 provincial election. Brownell won the party nomination to take his place as Liberal candidate. Although the election was expected to be close, he defeated Progressive Conservative Todd Lalonde by about 5500 votes. On May 21, 2004, he was appointed parliamentary assistant to George Smitherman, the Minister of Health and Long-Term Care. He then served as the parliamentary assistant to the Minister of Tourism, Monique Smith.

In the 2007 provincial election he was re-elected over PC candidate Chris Savard by 3,827 votes. In 2009 he was appointed as parliamentary assistant to the Minister of Consumer Services. On November 19, 2010, he announced that he would not run in the 2011 election.

Electoral record

References

External links

1948 births
Living people
Ontario Liberal Party MPPs
University of Ottawa alumni
21st-century Canadian politicians